I Am Singh is a 2011 Indian action film which was released on 2 December 2011. The film stars Gulzar Inder Chahal,  Rizwan Haider and Puneet Issar who also directed the film and wrote the screenplay. I Am Singh portrays the stories of Sikh immigrants in the US after the terrorist attacks of September 11, 2001. The film highlights what happened to the immigrants and their fight against prejudice, never losing faith in the American judicial system.

Plot
Ranveer Singh is shocked when his younger brother living in the US is killed in a post-9/11 hate crime. He travels to Los Angeles to bring his brother's murderers to justice. There he meets former LAPD officer Fateh Singh and Pakistani American Rizwan Hyder who help him uncover the truth of what really happened.

Cast
Gulzar Inder Chahal as Ranveer Singh
Rizwan Haider as Rizwan Hyder
Amy Rasimas as Amy Washington
Puneet Issar as Fateh Singh
Brooke Johnston as Amelia White 
Tulip Joshi as Sara Hasan
Mike Singh as Ajit Singh
Yusuf Hussain as Hasan, Sara's father
Neetha Mohindra as Simran Kaur, Ajit's wife
Kavi Raz as Ranjit Singh, Ranveer's father
Donny Kapoor as Veer Singh

Soundtrack
"Dukalaang Praanasi" (Daler Mehndi)                                                   6:55
"I Am Singh" (Daler Mehndi, Hard Kaur and Sukhwinder Singh)        6:45
"Dhol Wajda" (Mika Singh)                                                                   4:30
"Kya Jeena" (Rahat Fateh Ali Khan)                                                       
"Channd Paregge" (Sonu Kakkar, Sukhwinder Singh)                            5:55
"Dil Naiyyo Lagda" (Gayatri Iyer)                                                          5:40
"Doori Hai" (Rahat Fateh Ali Khan)                                                           1:56
"Khanda Prithme Saajke" (Arvinder Singh)                                               3:28
"Turban Victory" (Kunal Ganjawala, Sukhwinder Singh)                       4:09
"I Am Singh (Video Edit)" (Daler Mehndi)                                                  3:55

Reception
Taran Adarsh of Bollywood Hungama gave the film 1 out of 5 stars stating "The intent is right, but the written material isn't convincing, while the execution of the material is archaic, reminiscent of the cinema of the 80s, where over the top performances were considered 'acting'." Nikhat Kazmi of the Times of India gave the film 2.5 out of 5 stars, stating, "Puneet Issar does make a valiant effort to make a meaningful film about the aftermath of 9/11. Sadly, the effort gets bogged down by the hysterical undertones and the preachy nature of the film which ends up essentially as a documentary on Sikhism." John Anderson of Variety states, "A little late and more than a little goofy, "I Am Singh" splices a very serious subject—post-9/11 hate crimes against turban-wearing Sikhs—onto a Bollywood format, diluting a sobering message with hysterical dance numbers, engorged dialogue, bimbo-esque blondes and over-the-top performances."

See also
List of cultural references to the September 11 attacks

References

External links
 
 

2011 films
Films based on the September 11 attacks
2010s Hindi-language films
Films shot in Los Angeles
Films scored by Surinder Sodhi
Punjabi-language Indian films
2010s Punjabi-language films
Films about Sikhism